James Paul Smagula (born January 15, 1976) is an American actor. He is best known for his work in television series such as The Sopranos, Bones, Grey's Anatomy, Parks and Recreation, and Rizzoli & Isles as well as films, including The Island and The Producers.

Early life
Smagula grew up in Lyndhurst, New Jersey and graduated from Lyndhurst High School in 1993. As a child, he was very active in music, playing piano, trumpet, and clarinet and taking private voice lessons. He auditioned for, and was accepted into, the acclaimed City Kids Repertory company in New York City at age 15 where he shared the stage with such artists as Whitney Houston, Gloria Estefan, and Demi Moore.

He went on to earn a BFA at New York University's Tisch School of the Arts in 1997 where he studied at both CAP 21 and The Classical Studio.

Career

Smagula made his professional acting debut at age 20 in the Papermill Playhouse production of Man of La Mancha. He also appeared in the American premiere of Children of Eden, also at Papermill Playhouse. Smagula also sings on that production's cast album. 

Smagula appeared in the ensemble and performed the role of Beadle Bamford in Sweeney Todd: The Demon Barber of Fleet Street at the Ahamanson Theater with Kelsey Grammer and Christine Baranski and also played the Beadle in the Signature Theater production in Arlington, VA, which starred Norm Lewis.

Smagula made his Broadway debut at age 24 in the ensemble of The Full Monty (2000). He performed the principal role of Dave Bukatinsky over 3 dozen times, opposite both Patrick Wilson and Will Chase. In 2002, he appeared in the Broadway revival of Man of La Mancha starring Brian Stokes Mitchell. 

Smagula played Ubaldo Piangi on the Third National Tour of The Phantom of the Opera and would later play the role on Broadway for one year.

In 2005, Smagula appeared as Sal Iacuzzo on HBO's The Sopranos. He also appeared in the film The Island, directed by Michael Bay and The Producers movie musical.

In 2008, Smagula starred as Rocky in the Encores! production of Damn Yankees! starring Sean Hayes and Jane Krakowski at the New York City Center. Ben Brantley of the New York Times said Smagula "harmonizes sweetly" on the iconic song "Heart."

Smagula appeared in Manhattan Theatre Club's production of To Be or Not To Be at the Friedman Theater on Broadway, directed by Casey Nicholaw. 

He also played a 10-week stint as Chef Louis in Disney's The Little Mermaid on Broadway 

In 2010, Smagula joined the Broadway company of Billy Elliot, where he performed the principal role of George over 50 times. He also appeared in the film Step Up 3D in 2010.

From 2011 to 2016, Smagula appeared in television shows including Hot in Cleveland, Grey's Anatomy, Jessie, Betty White's Off Their Rockers, Parks and Recreation, Sam and Cat, Brooklyn Nine-Nine, Rizzoli and Isles, Community, and Bones.

In 2017, Smagula played John Woodburn in the film Rebel in the Rye, written and directed by Danny Strong and starring Kevin Spacey and Nicholas Hoult.

From 2019 to 2020, Smagula played Monsieur Thénardier in the national tour of Les Misérables.

In 2022, he played Harry the Horse in Guys and Dolls at the The Eisenhower Theater.

In 2023, he played the dual role of Mr./Billy Webster in Stephen Sondheim and James Lapine's Sunday in the Park with George at the Pasadena Playhouse.

Filmography

Film

Television

References

1976 births
Living people
Male actors from New Jersey
American male film actors
Lyndhurst High School alumni
People from Lyndhurst, New Jersey
Tisch School of the Arts alumni